Kiss Me Again is a 2006 romantic drama film directed and co-written by William Tyler Smith. It stars Jeremy London and Katheryn Winnick.

Plot
Julian and Chalice, who have been married for three years, hit turmoil when Julian almost has an affair with a young Spanish student, Elena. Julian suggests, after learning from a neighbour engaged in such, that they look for another woman to join them and have a polygamous relationship. However, Julian has orchestrated affairs so that the woman happens to be Elena.

Cast 
 Jeremy London as Julian
 Katheryn Winnick as Chalice 
 Elisa Donovan as Malika 
 Mirelly Taylor as Elena

Reception 
Neil Genzlinger of The New York Times criticized the film as derivative and having poor performances. He said, "(Tyler) seems not to realize just how tired the notion of married folk deciding jointly to experiment with other partners is. The movie is so earnest that it's embarrassing."

References

External links
 

2006 films
2006 romantic drama films
American romantic drama films
Films about sexuality
Films about threesomes
2000s English-language films
2000s American films